Scarlato is a surname. Notable people with the surname include:

 Christian Scarlato (born 1983), Italian football player
 Gennaro Scarlato (born 1977), Italian football player and manager
 Orest Scarlato (1920–1994), Russian malacologist and hydrobiologist

See also
 Scarlat